Cristian Gonzalo Sena Seveso (born 15 June 1990) is a Uruguayan footballer who plays as a defender for Racing Club de Montevideo in the Uruguayan Primera División.

References

External links

1990 births
Living people
Liverpool F.C. (Montevideo) players
Rampla Juniors players
Oriente Petrolero players
Montevideo City Torque players
C.A. Progreso players
Racing Club de Montevideo players
Uruguayan Primera División players
Uruguayan Segunda División players
Bolivian Primera División players
Uruguayan footballers
Uruguayan expatriate footballers
Uruguayan expatriate sportspeople in Bolivia
Association football defenders